Bass Mansion may refer to:

John H. Bass Mansion, Fort Wayne, Indiana, listed on the National Register of Historic Places (NRHP)
Bass Mansion (Stevensville, Montana), listed on the NRHP in Ravalli County, Montana

See also
Bass House (disambiguation)